Heliodoro "Yoyo" Diaz (June 5, 1905 - January 1989) was a Cuban baseball pitcher in the Negro leagues. He played from 1922 to 1935 with the Cuban Stars (East) and the New York Cubans.

References

External links
 and Baseball-Reference Black Baseball stats and Seamheads

1905 births
1989 deaths
People from Puerto Padre
Cuban Stars (West) players
New York Cubans players